Hell Train is a 1985 French crime film directed by Roger Hanin. It was entered into the 14th Moscow International Film Festival where it won a Special Prize.

Plot
Three men are arrested at a local dance for disorderly conduct. After being released the men locate a young Arab and throw him from the window of a moving train. Isabelle witnesses their crime and informs the police. The crime and following police investigation causes racial tension throughout the town and soon a race riot threatens to erupt.

Cast
 Roger Hanin as Commissaire Couturier
 Gérard Klein as Salviat
 Christine Pascal as Isabelle
 Robin Renucci as Muller
 Fabrice Eberhard as Lacombe
 Xavier Maly as Legoff
 Benoît Régent as Jouffroy
 Didier Sandre as Dalbret
 Henri Tisot as Guilabert
 Béatrice Camurat as Mme Salviat
 Karim Allaoui as Karim
 Sam Karmann as Duval
 Pascale Pellegrin as Madeleine
 Nathalie Guérin as Mme Guilabert
 Alain Lahaye as Poli
 Vincent Solignac as Letellier
 Jacques Nolot as Lancry
 Anne Sinclair as herself
 Jacques Gamblin 
 Alex Descas

References

External links
 

1985 films
1985 crime films
French crime films
1980s French-language films
1980s French films